Natalie Henry (born 21 June 1981),  is an Australian country singer-songwriter.

Career
Henry commenced her music career in 2015 at the age of 34. She and her then husband Brock released Cold Love as The Wayward Henry in 2016.

In 2018, Henry released her debut solo album Apple & Pride,  addressing her marriage breakdown and emotional renewal.

In 2021, Henry signed with Beverly Hillbilly Records. In September 2021, Henry's second album, White Heat debuted at number 34 on the ARIA Chart.

Personal life
Henry was married to fellow musician Brock Henry. The pair who have three daughters Gia, Luca and Eddie. Brooke and Natalie released Cold Love as The Wayward Henry in 2016 and broke up shortly after.

The break up led to Henry's realisation that she was gay and she moved onto a relationship with fellow musician Emily A. Smith.

Discography

Albums

References

1981 births
21st-century Australian women singers
Australian lesbian musicians
Lesbian singers
Lesbian songwriters
Living people
Australian LGBT singers
Australian LGBT songwriters